Leptopelis parvus, also known as the Kanole forest treefrog, is a species of frog in the family Arthroleptidae. It is endemic to the Democratic Republic of the Congo and is only known from the Upemba National Park (Katanga Province, southern DRC).

Description
Adult males measure  and adult females  in snout–vent length. The overall appearance is stocky. The snout is obtuse. The tympanum is distinct. The fingers have no webbing whereas the toes have reduced webbing. The finger discs are distinct but small. Alcohol-preserved specimens are dorsally uniformly brown, without white line above the anus or along outer edges of the limbs. Males have a paired subgular vocal sac.

Habitat and conservation
If similar to other Leptopelis, the eggs are laid in a nest buried in mud near water, into which the larvae emerge and develop.

There is no information on threats to this poorly known species. It occurs in an area of low human impact and is unlikely to be threatened. It occurs within the Upemba National Park, a protected area.

References

parvus
Frogs of Africa
Amphibians of the Democratic Republic of the Congo
Endemic fauna of the Democratic Republic of the Congo
Taxa named by Robert F. Inger
Taxa named by Karl Patterson Schmidt
Amphibians described in 1959
Taxonomy articles created by Polbot